Nicholas Guyatt (born 1973) is a British historian and author and a lecturer in modern history at the University of Cambridge in the United Kingdom.

Career 
Guyatt's specific interests are on the racial and religious history of the United States. He also wrote a popular book, Have a Nice Doomsday, on Christian fundamentalist belief in the Rapture and how it is changing American foreign policy towards Israel.

References 

1973 births
Living people
British historians
Historians of the United States
Academic staff of York University
Fellows of Trinity Hall, Cambridge
Members of the University of Cambridge faculty of history